Chad Michael Paronto (born July 28, 1975) is an American former Major League Baseball player. Paronto attended the University of Massachusetts Amherst before being drafted by the Baltimore Orioles in the eighth round of the 1996 Major League Baseball Draft. Paronto's best pitches include a 90–94 mph fastball and a heavy sinker which he uses mainly with men on base.

High school years
Paronto attended Woodsville High School in Woodsville, New Hampshire and was a letterman in soccer, baseball, and basketball. In basketball, he won All-State honors and scored more than 1,000 points during his high school career. In baseball, he won All-State honors and was named the New Hampshire Player of the Year. Paronto graduated from Woodsville High School in 1993.

Professional career

Baltimore Orioles
In his debut year with the Orioles, Paronto went 1–3 with a 5.00 earned run average (ERA) and 16 strikeouts in 24 games.

Cleveland Indians
On November 19, 2001, Paronto was claimed off waivers by the Cleveland Indians.

Paronto had a decent year in 2002 with Cleveland, compiling an 0–2 record, and a 4.04 ERA and 23 strikeouts. After going 0–2 with a 9.45 ERA and six strikeouts in 6⅔ innings pitched.

St. Louis Cardinals
Paronto became a free agent in the 2003 off-season and signed with the St. Louis Cardinals. He never made it to the Major Leagues with the Cardinals.

Milwaukee Brewers
Paronto signed as a free agent with the Milwaukee Brewers in December 2004.

Paronto began the 2005 season with the Triple-A affiliate of the Brewers, the Nashville Sounds. With the Sounds, he went 3–1 with a 2.75 ERA and four saves in 27 relief appearances. However, Paronto was released by Milwaukee on June 17.

Atlanta Braves
Paronto signed with the Atlanta Braves on June 21, 2005, and was assigned to the Triple-A Richmond Braves.

On May 9, 2006, the Braves called Paronto back up to the Majors. He finished the season with a 2–3 record and a 3.18 ERA. In his first four appearances with Atlanta, he allowed one run.

On Opening Day 2007, Paronto recorded his first career save in a 5–3 extra-inning victory over the Phillies. On July 31, Paronto was optioned to Triple-A Richmond to make room on the roster for newly acquired first baseman Mark Teixeira. He finished the season with a 3–1 record and 3.57 ERA. On October 25, the Braves designated Paronto for assignment. Paronto refused an assignment to Triple-A and became a free agent.

Houston Astros
On December 18, 2007, he signed with the Houston Astros. On March 28, 2008, he was sent outright to the minors. He was called up to the majors on July 6, 2008, but was designated for assignment on July 31. He became a free agent after the season.

Paronto was re-signed to a minor league contract with the Astros on January 14, 2009, and was invited to spring training.  Paronto's contract was purchased from Triple-A Round Rock on July 17, 2009.

Boston Red Sox
On January 20, 2010, Paronto signed a minor league contract with the Boston Red Sox.

Pittsfield Colonials
Paronto pitched for the Pittsfield Colonials of the Can-Am League in 2011, his final professional season.

References

External links

1975 births
Living people
Major League Baseball pitchers
Baseball players from New Hampshire
Baltimore Orioles players
Cleveland Indians players
Atlanta Braves players
Houston Astros players
UMass Minutemen baseball players
Rochester Red Wings players
Akron Aeros players
Buffalo Bisons (minor league) players
Memphis Redbirds players
Nashville Sounds players
Richmond Braves players
Round Rock Express players
Pawtucket Red Sox players
Pittsfield Colonials players
People from Woodsville, New Hampshire
American expatriate baseball players in Australia